Typhlacontias rohani, Rohan's blind dart skink, is a species of lizard which is found in Namibia, Botswana, Zimbabwe, Zambia, and Angola.

References

rohani
Reptiles described in 1923
Taxa named by Fernand Angel